Kalila Stormfire's Economical Magick Services is a fantasy podcast about a young witch named Kalila running a business. The podcast was independently created and produced by Lisette Alvarez, a Cuban-American Queer content creator.

Background 
The podcast is about a witch named Kalila who has been cast out by her coven for making a mistake. Every episode is a case file discussing how she has diagnosed her patient. During the first couple episodes Kalila learns that she is being sabotaged. Lisette Alvarez is a Cuban-American. The show contains LGBT characters. Gavin Gaddis of thepodreport.com praised the show saying that "Kalila is one of the best indie audio fiction shows out there."

Awards

See also 

 List of fantasy podcasts

References

External links 

Audio podcasts
Scripted podcasts
Fantasy podcasts
2018 podcast debuts